KJJJ (102.3 FM, "Nash FM 102.3 KJJJ"), addressed as K – Triple J is a radio station licensed to serve Laughlin, in the U.S. state of Nevada. The station is owned by Steven M. Greeley. It airs a country music format.

The station was assigned the KJJJ call letters by the Federal Communications Commission on September 2, 1997.

KJJJ broadcasts in HD.

Translators and boosters

References

External links
 KJJJ official website

JJJ
Country radio stations in the United States
Radio stations established in 1994
Mass media in Mohave County, Arizona
Lake Havasu City, Arizona
1994 establishments in Nevada